The Pro League Championnat de Football National Division 1 (known as Orange Pro League Madagascar for sponsorship reasons) is the premier football league in Madagascar. Prior to 2019, it was known as the Three Horses Beer-sponsored THB Champions League.

Format 
1962-2019:

The competition is played in a round-robin format between the 24 qualifying clubs from the 22 regional leagues in the country. In the first round, the teams are divided into four groups of six teams, with each team playing the others once, and with the top three clubs of each group advancing to the next round. In the second round, the teams are divided into two groups of six teams, with each team playing the others once, and with the top two clubs of each group advancing to the final round. In the final round, called the Groupe des As, the four teams play each other twice and the winner is crowned as the champion.

Late 2019-present:

In October 2019, the competition evolved to be a more professional league comprising 12 teams. Each team square off against each other twice (1 home match and 1 away) during the course of the season. The team having the most points at the end of the season becomes Malagasy champions.

From December 2019, the competition became known as Orange Pro League Madagascar due to sponsorship reasons.

Current clubs (2021−22 season)

Northern Group 
Ajesaia
COSFA Analamanga
Fanalamanga FC
Five FC
Fosa Juniors FC
JET Kintana
Tia Kitra FC
USCA Foot

Southern Group 
3FB Toliara
CFFA Analamanga
CNaPS Sport
Dato Farafangana FC
Elgeco Plus FC
JFC Toliara
Mama FC
Zanakala FC

Previous winners

THB Champions League

1956 : Ambatondrazaka Sport
1957–61 : unknown
1962 : AS Fortior (Toamasina)
1963 : AS Fortior (Toamasina)
1964–67 : unknown
1968 : Fitarikandro (Fianarantsoa)
1969 : US Fonctionnaires (Antananarivo)
1970 : MMM Toamasina
1971 : AS St. Michel (Antananarivo)
1972 : Fortior Mahajanga
1973 : JS Antalaha
1974 : AS Corps Enseignement (Toliara)
1975 : AS Corps Enseignement (Toliara)
1976 : no championship
1977 : AS Corps Enseignement (Toliara)
1978 : AS St. Michel (Antananarivo)
1979 : Fortior Mahajanga
1980 : MMM Toamasina
1981 : AS Somasud (Toliara)
1982 : Dinamo Fima (Antananarivo)
1983 : Dinamo Fima (Antananarivo)
1984 : no championship
1985 : AS Sotema (Mahajanga)
1986 : BTM Antananarivo
1987 : Jos Nosy-Bé (Hell-Ville)
1988 : COSFAP Antananarivo (Antananarivo)
1989 : AS Sotema (Mahajanga)
1990 : ASF Fianarantsoa
1991 : AS Sotema (Mahajanga)
1992 : AS Sotema (Mahajanga)
1993 : BTM Antananarivo
1994 : FC Rainizafy
1995 : Fobar (Toliara)
1996 : FC BFV (Antananarivo)
1997 : DSA Antananarivo
1998 : DSA Antananarivo
1999 : AS Fortior (Toamasina)
2000 : AS Fortior (Toamasina)
2001 : SO l'Emyrne (Antananarivo)
2002 : AS Adema (Antananarivo)
2003 : Ecoredipharm (Tamatave)
2004 : USJF/Ravinala (Antananarivo)
2005 : USCA Foot (Antananarivo)
2006 : AS Adema (Antananarivo)
2007 : Ajesaia (Antananarivo)
2008 : Académie Ny Antsika (Vakinankaratra)
2009 : Ajesaia (Antananarivo)
2010 : CNaPS Sport (Miarinarivo)
2011 : Japan Actuel's FC (Analamanga)
2012 : AS Adema (Antananarivo)
2013 : CNaPS Sport (Miarinarivo)
2014 : CNaPS Sport (Miarinarivo)
2015 : CNaPS Sport (Miarinarivo)
2016 : CNaPS Sport (Miarinarivo)
2017 : CNaPS Sport (Miarinarivo)
2018 : CNaPS Sport (Miarinarivo)
2019 : Fosa Juniors FC (Mahajanga)
2019–20 : abandoned 
2020–2021 : AS Adema (Antananarivo)

Orange Pro League
2019–20 : Season cancelled

Performance by club

References

External links
League at fifa.com
RSSSF competition history

Football leagues in Madagascar
Madagascar